Bossas & Ballads: The Lost Sessions  is an album by jazz saxophonist Stan Getz.

Background
In 1989, Getz recorded his first album for A&M Records, but album wasn't released until 2003. Getz recorded the album with Kenny Barron, Victor Lewis, and George Mraz, and it was produced by Herb Alpert.

Track listing

Personnel
 Stan Getz – tenor saxophone
 Kenny Barron – piano
 George Mraz – double bass
 Victor Lewis – drums

References

1989 albums
Albums produced by Herb Alpert
Bossa nova albums
Stan Getz albums
Verve Records albums